is a Japanese footballer currently playing as a midfielder for Júbilo Iwata.

Club career
Born in Shiga Prefecture, Furukawa started his career with local side Azul FC before moving to professional team Kyoto Sanga.

In late 2021, it was announced that Furukawa would sign for J1 League side Júbilo Iwata ahead of the 2022 season. He played in a 10–1 friendly victory against Iwate Grulla Morioka on 24 January 2022, impressing onlookers with his dribbling ability. After the win, Furukawa caused some controversy on his social media account, by stating he was not motivated by the opposition in the easy win.

Style of play
An excellent dribbler of the ball, Furukawa found national and international acclaim after scoring a solo goal for Shizuoka Gakuen High School.

Career statistics

Club
.

Notes

References

2003 births
Living people
Association football people from Shiga Prefecture
Japanese footballers
Association football midfielders
Kyoto Sanga FC players
Júbilo Iwata players